Papilio mackinnoni, the Mackinnon's swallowtail, is a species of swallowtail butterfly from the genus Papilio that is found in Kenya, Tanzania, Malawi, Zambia, Angola, Uganda, Zaire, South Sudan, the Republic of the Congo, Rwanda and Burundi.

The larvae feed on Rutaceae, Clausema, Toddalia, Citrus, Teclea simplicifolia, T. nobilis and T. tricocarpa.

Subspecies
Papilio mackinnoni mackinnoni (southern Sudan, Republic of the Congo, Uganda, Rwanda, Burundi, Kenya, north-eastern Tanzania)
Papilio mackinnoni benguellae Jordan, 1908  (highlands of central Angola)
Papilio mackinnoni theodori Riley, 1921  (southern Zaire, north-western Zambia)
Papilio mackinnoni isokae (Hancock, 1984)  (north-eastern Zambia, western Tanzania, northern Malawi)
Papilio mackinnoni mpwapwana Kielland, 1990  (eastern Tanzania)
Papilio mackinnoni reductofascia Kielland, 1990 (northern Tanzania, southern Kenya)

Habitat
Congolian forests and Albertine Rift montane forests.

Biogeographic realm
This species is located in the Afrotropical realm.

References

Carcasson, R.H., 1960, "The Swallowtail Butterflies of East Africa (Lepidoptera, Papilionidae)". Journal of the East Africa Natural History Society pdf Key to East Africa members of the species group, diagnostic and other notes and figures. (Permission to host granted by The East Africa Natural History Society)

External links
Butterfly Corner Images from Naturhistorisches Museum Wien

mackinnoni
Butterflies described in 1891
Butterflies of Africa